Virtual Safari is a 1997 video game developed by Anglia Multimedia and published by Fujitsu Interactive. The game is set in a first-person 3D environment around Africa on a Safari trip to take photographs of animals. The photographs could be submitted to Anglia Multimedia and the best ones would be displayed on their website.

Gameplay
The player navigates around Three Trees Lodge, acquiring items and solving puzzles. Much of the information required comes from the Colonel. Before the player can pick up items, the rucksack must be obtained. The player's main objective is to get the camera equipment out of the front room chest and take photographs of animals in the wild. Travelling from the lodge to other areas requires the use of the Colonel's car. The player has access to six books with facts about animals and a minigame.

Development
Anglia Multimedia made use of Superscape technology to get the virtual reality effect. The game also compatible with Stereo Glasses and other VR utilities.

Reception

Critical reception

Promotion
Anglia Multimedia showcased the game to the London Zoo.

References

1997 video games
Windows games
Windows-only games
Video games developed in the United States
Video games set in Africa
Single-player video games